Squires Glacier is a tributary glacier between the Playfair and Hutton Mountains, flowing east-northeast to Swann Glacier, in Palmer Land. Mapped by United States Geological Survey (USGS) from surveys and U.S. Navy air photos, 1961–67. Named by Advisory Committee on Antarctic Names (US-ACAN) for Peter L. Squires, glaciologist at Byrd Station, summer 1965–66.

Glaciers of Palmer Land